Sar Ney is a village in Hejdandasht Rural District, Salehabad District, Mehran County, Ilam Province, Iran. At the 2006 census, its population was 21, in 4 families. The village is populated by Kurds.

References 

Populated places in Mehran County
Kurdish settlements in Ilam Province